Qaleh Babu (also Romanized as  Qal‘eh Bābū and Qal‘eh-ye Bābū; also known as Ghal’eh Baboo and Qal‘eh Bānū) is a village in Chahar Cheshmeh Rural District, Kamareh District, Khomeyn County, Markazi Province, Iran. At the 2006 census, its population was 414, in 93 families.

References 

Populated places in Khomeyn County